Hunt County is a county in the U.S. state of Texas. As of the 2020 census, its population was 99,956. Its county seat is Greenville. The county is named for Memucan Hunt, Jr., the first Republic of Texas Minister to the United States from 1837 to 1838 and the third Texas Secretary of the Navy from 1838 to 1839. Hunt County is part of the Dallas-Fort Worth-Arlington metropolitan statistical area.

Geography

Lakes 
 Lake Tawakoni

Major highways

  Interstate 30
  U.S. Highway 67
  U.S. Highway 69
  U.S. Highway 380
  State Highway 11
  State Highway 24
  State Highway 34
  State Highway 50
  State Highway 66
  State Highway 224
  State Highway 276
  Loop 178
  Spur 302

Adjacent counties

 Fannin County (north)
 Delta County (northeast)
 Hopkins County (east)
 Rains County (southeast)
 Van Zandt County (southeast)
 Kaufman County (south)
 Rockwall County (southwest)
 Collin County (west)

Communities

Cities

 Caddo Mills
 Campbell
 Celeste
 Commerce (part in Delta County)
 Greenville (county seat)
 Hawk Cove
 Josephine (mainly in Collin County)
 Lone Oak
 Quinlan
 Royse City (mostly in Rockwall County and partly in Collin County)
 Union Valley
 West Tawakoni
 Wolfe City

Towns
 Neylandville
 Poetry (also in Kaufman County)

Unincorporated communities

 Cash
 Fairlie
 Floyd
 Jacobia
 Kingston
 Merit
 Mexico
 South Sulphur

Demographics

Note: the US Census treats Hispanic/Latino as an ethnic category. This table excludes Latinos from the racial categories and assigns them to a separate category. Hispanics/Latinos can be of any race.

As of the census of 2000, 76,596 people, 28,742 households, and 20,521 families resided in the county.  The population density was 91 people per square mile (35/km2).  The 32,490 housing units averaged 39 per square mile (15/km2).  The racial makeup of the county was 83.57% White, 9.45% Black or African American, 0.73% Native American, 0.54% Asian, 0.07% Pacific Islander, 3.93% from other races, and 1.70% from two or more races.  About 8.31% of the population were Hispanic or Latino of any race.

Of the 28,742 households, 32.90% had children under the age of 18 living with them, 56.20% were married couples living together, 11.00% had a female householder with no husband present, and 28.60% were not families; 24.10% of all households were made up of individuals, and 9.60% had someone living alone who was 65 years of age or older.  The average household size was 2.60 and the average family size was 3.08.

In the county, the population was distributed as 26.50% under the age of 18, 10.00% from 18 to 24, 28.00% from 25 to 44, 22.80% from 45 to 64, and 12.60% who were 65 years of age or older.  The median age was 36 years. For every 100 females, there were 98.10 males.  For every 100 females age 18 and over, there were 95.30 males.

The median income for a household in the county was $36,752, and for a family was $44,388. Males had a median income of $33,347 versus $23,085 for females. The per capita income for the county was $17,554.  About 8.60% of families and 12.80% of the population were below the poverty line, including 15.80% of those under age 18 and 11.70% of those age 65 or over.

Media
Hunt County is part of the Dallas/Fort Worth DMA. Local media outlets are: KDFW-TV, KXAS-TV, WFAA-TV, KTVT-TV, KERA-TV, KTXA-TV, KDFI-TV, KDAF-TV, KFWD-TV, and KDTX-TV. Other nearby stations that provide coverage for Hunt County come from the Tyler/Longview/Jacksonville market, and they include: KLTV-TV, KYTX-TV, KFXK-TV, KCEB-TV, and KETK-TV. In addition to this, there is a radio station located at Texas A&M University-Commerce called KETR and located on 88.9 FM on the radio. KETR is a 100,000 watt radio station that can reach up to 75 miles away; the station serves Commerce, A&M-Commerce, Hunt County, and surrounding cities. KGVL in Greenville is another radio station within the county. Two newspapers besides The Dallas Morning News circulate within the county. They are the Herald-Banner (Greenville) and the Commerce Journal (Commerce).

Education

The following school districts serve Hunt County:
 Bland ISD (small portion in Collin County)
 Boles ISD
 Caddo Mills ISD
 Campbell ISD
 Celeste ISD
 Commerce ISD (small portion in Delta County)
 Community ISD (mostly in Collin County)
 Cooper ISD (mostly in Delta County)
 Cumby ISD (mostly in Hopkins County)
 Fannindel ISD (mostly in Fannin County; small portion in Delta, Lamar counties)
 Greenville ISD
 Leonard ISD (mostly in Fannin County, small portion in Collin County)
 Lone Oak ISD (small portion in Rains County)
 Quinlan ISD
 Royse City ISD (mostly in Rockwall County, small portion in Collin County)
 Terrell ISD (mostly in Kaufman County)
 Wolfe City ISD (small portion in Fannin County)

In addition, Texas A&M University-Commerce and Paris Junior College-Greenville Center  are located within the county.

Top employers

Note*: A rough estimate of the four combined Walmarts in Hunt County in the cities of Greenville (two: one supercenter and one neighborhood market), Commerce (one supercenter), and Quinlan (one supercenter). In 2020 HRMC full-time employees has grown to over 1200 people.

Public transportation

A public transit called the Connection serves all of Hunt County. The transit operates Monday through Friday from 7 am to 7 pm. Reservations have to be made one day in advance and the transit charges $2 ($4 round trip) if the passenger is traveling to a place within the same community or city, and $3 ($6 round trip) if the passenger is traveling from one city or community to another within Hunt County. Also, the transit will take Hunt County residents to Dallas; this is offered round-trip only, passengers are charged $34, and a minimum of three passengers is also required.

Medical services

Hunt County's medical needs are primarily served by Hunt Regional Healthcare, with the Hunt Regional Medical Center located in Greenville being the largest hospital in the county.

Veterans services
The Disabled American Veterans, Chapter 81, located at 2502 Church Street, offers veterans and their dependents a meeting place and assistance with filing and mailing disability forms.

The American Legion Otho Morgan Post 17 meets at 4509 Moulton St.

Notable people

 Waggoner Carr, Texas state representative and attorney general

 Audie Murphy, World War II soldier and Medal of Honor recipient
 Cline Paden, evangelist and missionary
 Bart Millard, singer

Politics

See also

 Audie Murphy American Cotton Museum
 List of museums in North Texas
 National Register of Historic Places listings in Hunt County, Texas
 Recorded Texas Historic Landmarks in Hunt County

References

Further reading

External links

 Hunt County official web site
 Hunt County in Handbook of Texas Online

 
Dallas–Fort Worth metroplex counties
1846 establishments in Texas
Populated places established in 1846